CCSS may refer to:
 Common Core State Standards Initiative, a set of educational standards
 Cambridge Centre for Sixth-form Studies, an independent six-form college
 Community College Survey of Student Engagement, a survey of people in a community college
 Council of Chief State School Officers, a non-partisan non-profit organization
 Candy Crush Soda Saga